GVT may refer to:

 Gauge vector–tensor gravity in astrophysics 
 German volume training, a form of weight training
 Global Village Telecom, a Brazilian telecommunications company
 GVT TV, a Brazilian television channel
 Glyn Valley Tramway in Wales
 Graft-versus-tumor effect in transplantation medicine 
 Grand Valley Trail, in Ontario, Canada
 Grand Valley Transit, a public transportation agency in Colorado
 Green Valley Township (disambiguation), various settlements in the United States 
 Green View Tower, a skyscraper in Tijuana, Mexico
 Graphics Virtualization Technology, an Intel technology 
 Gravity-vacuum transit, a proposed transportation system
 Group voting ticket, a voting system in Australia
 Majors Airport, serving Greenville, Texas